Marinen is a Norwegian and Swedish language word meaning "The Navy". It may refer to:

The Finnish Navy
The Royal Norwegian Navy
The Swedish Navy